Carlson Richard Wellesley Dickel (born 2 July 1946) is a New Zealand former sportsman. He played first-class cricket for Otago and Canterbury between 1970 and 1983.

Dickel was born at Dunedin in 1946 and educated at Otago Boys' High School. He worked as a teacher and was the coach for the New Zealand women's national basketball team for ten years and for the Otago Nuggets for four seasons. One of his sons, Mark Dickel, played basketball for the national side whilst another son, Richard Dickel is a basketball coach.

References

External links
 

1946 births
Living people
New Zealand cricketers
Canterbury cricketers
Otago cricketers
Cricketers from Dunedin